Rinchen Lhamo (1901 – 13 November 1929), also written as Rin-chen Lha-mo, was a Tibetan writer. Her book, We Tibetans, was published in English in 1926.

Early life
Rinchen Lhamo was born into a respected family in Kham, Tibet.

In England
In 1919, Rinchen Lhamo married a British diplomat at Dartsedo, Louis Magrath King (1886-1949); theirs is often described as "probably the first Tibetan-British marriage". King was born in China, the son of writer Margaret Williamson King and the grandson of Scottish missionary Alexander Williamson. King had to retire from the consular service to make their marriage official, and they traveled to England in 1925 on a Japanese ship, to avoid being separated.

In 1926, possibly in response to the John Noel film The Epic of Everest (1924), Lhamo published We Tibetans: An Intimate Picture by a Woman of Tibet, of an Interesting and Distinctive People, a guide to Tibetan culture, religion, and folklore, in English, with an introduction by her British husband. "We are neither primitive nor bizarre," she explained of Tibet to English-speaking newspaper readers. "We are like yourselves, a people with a highly developed culture, spiritual, social, and material. Our minds are no less active, our wits are no less keen, than yours." She particularly objected to how Tibetan women and gender roles were portrayed in Western accounts. Her opinions about Western beauty, culture, and wealth were reported in many newspapers.

She and her husband gave Tibetan objects to the British Museum in the 1920s.

Personal life
Rinchen Lhamo and Louis Magrath Tindal King had four children together, including Paul Henry Tindal King (1923-2016), Yudre Louise King (the oldest, died as a child), and Martha Rolfe nee King(1922-2003) and Alec King. Rinchen Lhamo moved to England in 1925 with her husband, their children, and her brother. The family lived in Kensington and Hildenborough, and Rinchen Lhamo died at the latter town in 1929, aged 28 years, from tuberculosis.

References

External links
 Rin-chen Lha-mo (Mrs. Louis King), We Tibetans, London: Seeley, Service, 1926.
 
 Tim Chamberlain, "Rinchen Lhamo - A Woman of Kham" Waymarks (1 March 2014). A blogpost about Rinchen Lhamo.
 Interview of Rinchen Lhamo in Aug. 1925 by the Vote
 Veronica Prior, "Louis Magrath King and Rinchen Lhamo" Rants by Ronni (15 January 2006). A blog post about Rinchen Lhamo by a daughter of Louis Magrath King.

1901 births
1929 deaths
Tibetan writers